W32.Alcra. F is a computer worm that is spread by P2P file sharing networks.  It is regarded as a low-risk virus, and is usually detected by a virus scan.

Effects
The W32.Alcra. F worm saves a number of empty files and links to a computer, and then attempts to connect to those links thus causing an error.

Detection and removal 
A full system scan usually can find, and remove this worm without much difficulty.

References

Computer worms